In enzymology, a mevaldate reductase (NADPH) is an enzyme that catalyzes the chemical reaction

(R)-mevalonate + NADP+  mevaldate + NADPH + H+

Thus, the two substrates of this enzyme are (R)-mevalonate and NADP+, whereas its 3 products are mevaldate, NADPH, and H+.

This enzyme belongs to the family of oxidoreductases, specifically those acting on the CH-OH group of donor with NAD+ or NADP+ as acceptor. The systematic name of this enzyme class is (R)-mevalonate:NADP+ oxidoreductase. Other names in common use include mevaldate (reduced nicotinamide adenine dinucleotide phosphate), reductase, and mevaldate reductase (NADPH).

References

 
 
 

EC 1.1.1
NADPH-dependent enzymes
Enzymes of unknown structure